Maksat Yesengeldiuly Taykenov (Maqsat Esengeldıūly Täikenov; born 14 August 1997) is a Kazakhstani footballer who plays as a midfielder for Caspiy and the Kazakhstan national team.

Career
Taykenov began his senior career with Bayterek, before moving to Caspiy in 2018. He made his professional debut with Caspiy in a 3–0 Kazakhstan Premier League loss to FC Kairat on 18 August 2020.

International career
Taykenov made his international debut for the Kazakhstan national team in a 1–0 2022 FIFA World Cup qualification loss to Finland on 4 September 2021.

References

External links
 
 Vesti Profile

1997 births
Living people
People from Aktau
Kazakhstani footballers
Kazakhstan international footballers
Association football midfielders
FC Caspiy players
Kazakhstan Premier League players
21st-century Kazakhstani people